The following is a list of regional football leagues in Argentina sorted by province.

Buenos Aires

Liga Albertina de fútbol 
Liga Alvearense de fútbol (Buenos Aires)
Liga Amateur de Deportes (Lincoln)
Liga Amateur Platense de fútbol
Liga Ameghinese de fútbol
Liga Ayacuchense de fútbol
Liga Balcarceña de fútbol
Liga Bragadense de fútbol
Liga Campanense de fútbol
Liga Carhuense de fútbol
Liga Casarense de fútbol
Liga Chascomunense de fútbol
Liga Chivilcoyana de fútbol
Liga Cultural Deportiva (Tres Lomas)
Liga de fútbol (Roque Pérez)
Liga de fútbol de Arrecifes
Liga de fútbol de Azul
Liga de fútbol de Baradero
Liga de fútbol de Coronel Dorrego
Liga de fútbol de General Alvarado
Liga de fútbol de General Villegas
Liga de fútbol de Las Flores
Liga de fútbol de Mar Chiquita
Liga de fútbol de Olavarría
Liga de fútbol de Salto
Liga de fútbol de Villarino
Liga de fútbol del Oeste (América/Rivadavia)
Liga de fútbol del Partido de la Costa
Liga de fútbol Las Sierras
Liga de fútbol Pergamino
Liga del Sur (Bahía Blanca)
Liga Deportiva Carmen de Areco
Liga Deportiva Central (Leandro N. Alem)
Liga Deportiva de Bolívar
Liga Deportiva de Cañuelas
Liga Deportiva de Chacabuco
Liga Deportiva de Colón 
Liga Deportiva de fútbol (Rojas) 
Liga Deportiva de General Arenales
Liga Deportiva de Saladillo
Liga Deportiva de San Antonio de Areco
Liga Deportiva del Oeste (Junín)
Liga Deportiva del Sur
Liga Deportiva Puanense
Liga Deportiva Sampedrina
Liga Dolorense de fútbol (Buenos Aires)
Liga Escobarense de Fútbol
Liga Guaminense de fútbol
Liga Juarense de fútbol
Liga Lapridense de fútbol
Liga Lobense de fútbol
Liga Loberense de fútbol
Liga Lujanense de fútbol
Liga Madariaguense de fútbol
Liga Maipuense de fútbol
Liga Marplatense de fútbol
Liga Mercedina de fútbol
Liga Montense de fútbol
Liga Necochense de fútbol
Liga Nicoleña de fútbol
Liga Nuevejuliense de fútbol
Liga Pehuajense de fútbol
Liga Pringles de fútbol
Liga Rauchense de fútbol
Liga Regional de fútbol (Coronel Suárez)
Liga Regional Tresarroyense de fútbol
Liga Tandilense de fútbol
Liga Toldense de fútbol
Liga Trenquelauquense de fútbol
Liga Veinticinqueña de fútbol
Liga Zarateña de fútbol

Catamarca

Liga Andalgalense de fútbol
Liga Belenista de fútbol
Liga Catamarqueña de fútbol
Liga Chacarera de fútbol (Valle Viejo)
Liga Departamental de fútbol de Pomán
Liga Departamental de fútbol de Recreo
Liga Fiambalense de fútbol
Liga Santamariana de fútbol
Liga Tinogasteña de fútbol

Chaco

Asociación de fútbol del Oeste Chaqueño (Villa Ángela)
Liga Chaqueña de fútbol
Liga de fútbol del Noroeste Chaqueño (Las Breñas)
Liga de fútbol del Norte (General José de San Martín)
Liga Deportiva y Cultural Las Palmas
Liga Quitilipense de fútbol
Liga Regional de fútbol (Machagai)
Liga Saenzpeñense de fútbol

Chubut

Liga de fútbol de Comodoro Rivadavia
Liga de fútbol del Oeste del Chubut (Esquel)
Liga de fútbol Valle del Chubut (Trelew)

Córdoba

Liga Bellvillense de fútbol
Liga Cordobesa de fútbol
Liga Cruzdelejeña de fútbol
Liga de fútbol del Departamento General Roca
Liga Departamental de fútbol de Punilla
Liga Departamental Santa María
Liga Dolorense de fútbol (Córdoba)
Liga Independiente de Fútbol (Oncativo)
Liga Ischilín de fútbol
Liga Regional de Colón
Liga Regional de fútbol de Canals
Liga Regional de fútbol de Laboulaye
Liga Regional de fútbol de Río Cuarto
Liga Regional de fútbol de San Francisco
Liga Regional de fútbol del Sur (Corral de Bustos)
Liga Regional de fútbol Dr. Adrián Beccar Varela
Liga Regional de fútbol San Alberto
Liga Regional Riotercerense de fútbol
Liga Villamariense de fútbol

Corrientes

Liga Bellavistense de fútbol
Liga Correntina de fútbol
Liga de fútbol General Belgrano
Liga Deportiva Casereña General San Martín
Liga Esquinense de fútbol
Liga Goyana de fútbol
Liga Ituzaingueña de fútbol
Liga Libreña de fútbol
Liga Mercedeña de fútbol
Liga Santomeña de fútbol
Liga Virasoreña de fútbol

Entre Ríos

Liga Concordiense de fútbol
Liga de fútbol de Chajarí
Liga de fútbol de Concepción del Uruguay
Liga de fútbol de Paraná Campaña
Liga Departamental de fútbol (Rosario del Tala)
Liga Departamental de fútbol de Colón
Liga Departamental de fútbol de Gualeguay
Liga Departamental de fútbol de Gualeguaychú
Liga Departamental de fútbol de Nogoyá
Liga Diamantina de fútbol
Liga Federalense de fútbol
Liga Felicianense de fútbol
Liga Paceña de fútbol
Liga Paranaense de fútbol
Liga Regional de fútbol
Liga Santaelenense de fútbol
Liga Victoriense de fútbol
Liga Villaguayense de fútbol
Liga Zonal de fútbol (Caseros)

Formosa

Liga Clorindense de fútbol
Liga de fútbol de Laguna Blanca
Liga de fútbol del Centro (Ibarreta)
Liga de fútbol del Sur (El Colorado)
Liga Formoseña de fútbol
Liga Piranense de fútbol

Jujuy 

Liga Departamental de fútbol del Carmen
Liga Jujeña de Fútbol
Liga Regional Jujeña de fútbol (Libertador Gral. San Martín)

La Pampa 

Liga Cultural de fútbol
Liga Pampeana de fútbol (General Pico)

La Rioja 

Liga Aimogasteña de fútbol
Liga Chileciteña de fútbol
Liga Cultural y Deportiva Los Llanos
Liga de fútbol del Sur Riojano
Liga Riojana de fútbol

Mendoza 

Liga Alvearense de fútbol (Mendoza)
Liga de fútbol de Tunuyán
Liga Malargüina de fútbol
Liga Mendocina de fútbol
Liga Rivadaviense de fútbol
Liga Sancarlina de fútbol
Liga Sanrafaelina de fútbol
Liga Tupungatina de fútbol

Misiones 

Liga Apostoleña de fútbol
Liga de fútbol de Eldorado
Liga Posadeña de fútbol
Liga Regional de fútbol de Iguazú
Liga Regional de fútbol de Puerto Rico
Liga Regional Obereña de fútbol

Neuquén 

Liga de fútbol del Neuquén

Río Negro 

Liga de fútbol de Bariloche
Liga de fútbol de Río Colorado
Liga Deportiva Confluencia
Liga Regional Atlántica de fútbol
Liga Regional de fútbol Avellaneda
Liga Rionegrina de fútbol

Salta 

Liga Anteña de fútbol
Liga Calchaquí de fútbol
Liga de fútbol de Rosario de la Frontera
Liga de fútbol de Vespucio
Liga Regional de fútbol del Bermejo
Liga de fútbol del Valle de Lerma
Liga Departamental de fútbol Gral. San Martín
Liga Güemense de fútbol
Liga Metanense de fútbol
Liga Salteña de fútbol

San Juan 

Liga Calingasteña de fútbol
Liga Caucetera de fútbol
Liga de fútbol de Albardón Angaco
Liga Iglesiana de fútbol
Liga Jachallera de fútbol
Liga Sanjuanina de fútbol
Liga Sarmientina de fútbol
Liga Veinticinqueña de fútbol

San Luis 

Liga Daractense de fútbol
Liga de fútbol de Mercedes
Liga de fútbol del Norte Puntano
Liga Sanluiseña de fútbol
Liga Valle del Conlara

Santa Cruz

Liga de fútbol Centro (Com.L.Piedra Buena)
Liga de fútbol Sur (Río Gallegos)
Liga de fútbol Norte de Santa Cruz

Santa Fe

Asociación Rosarina de Fútbol
Liga Cañadense de fútbol
Liga Casildense de fútbol
Liga Ceresina de fútbol
Liga Esperancina de fútbol
Liga de fútbol Regional del Sud (Villa Constitución)
Liga Departamental de fútbol San Martín
Liga Deportiva del Sur (Alcorta)
Liga Galvense de fútbol
Liga Interprovincial de fútbol (Chañar Ladeado)
Liga Ocampense de fútbol
Liga Rafaelina de fútbol
Liga Reconquistense fútbol
Liga Regional Sanlorencina de fútbol
Liga Regional Totorense de fútbol
Liga Sancristobalense de fútbol
Liga Santafesina de Fútbol
Liga Venadense de fútbol
Liga Verense de fútbol

Santiago del Estero 

Liga Añatuyense de fútbol
Liga Cultural de fútbol de Frías
Liga Santiagueña de Fútbol
Liga Termense de fútbol

Tierra del Fuego, Antártida e Islas del Atlántico Sur

Liga Oficial de fútbol Río Grande
Liga Ushuaiense de Fútbol

Tucumán

Liga Tucumana de Fútbol

External links
 Ascenso del Interior  
 Interior Futbolero  

       
Association football in Argentina lists
6